The 2020 Rain or Shine Elasto Painters season was the 14th season of the franchise in the Philippine Basketball Association (PBA).

Key dates
December 8, 2019: The 2019 PBA draft took place in Midtown Atrium, Robinson Place Manila.
March 11, 2020: The PBA postponed the season due to the threat of the coronavirus.

Draft

Special draft

Regular draft

Roster

Philippine Cup

Eliminations

Standings

Game log

|-bgcolor=ccffcc
| 1
| October 13
| San Miguel
| W 87–83
| Javee Mocon (25)
| Gabe Norwood (11)
| Rey Nambatac (4)
| AUF Sports Arena & Cultural Center
| 1–0
|-bgcolor=ccffcc
| 2
| October 16
| Terrafirma
| W 91–82
| Rey Nambatac (19)
| Javee Mocon (10)
| Gabe Norwood (4)
| AUF Sports Arena & Cultural Center
| 2–0
|-bgcolor=ccffcc
| 3
| October 18
| NorthPort
| W 70–68
| Adrian Wong (15)
| Beau Belga (7)
| Rey Nambatac (6)
| AUF Sports Arena & Cultural Center
| 3–0
|-bgcolor=ffcccc
| 4
| October 22
| Alaska
| L 88–89
| Sidney Onwubere (16)
| Beau Belga (5)
| Rey Nambatac (7)
| AUF Sports Arena & Cultural Center
| 3–1
|-bgcolor=ccffcc
| 5
| October 27
| Ginebra
| W 85–82
| Beau Belga (20)
| Beau Belga (10)
| 4 players (4)
| AUF Sports Arena & Cultural Center
| 4–1

|-bgcolor=ffcccc
| 6
| November 4
| NLEX
| L 74–94
| Rey Nambatac (15)
| Torres, Norwood (6)
| Javee Mocon (4)
| AUF Sports Arena & Cultural Center
| 4–2
|-bgcolor=ffcccc
| 7
| November 5
| Meralco
| L 78–85
| James Yap (18)
| James Yap (7)
| Gabe Norwood (3)
| AUF Sports Arena & Cultural Center
| 4–3
|-bgcolor=ffcccc
| 8
| November 7
| Magnolia
| L 62–70
| Kris Rosales (14)
| Javee Mocon (10)
| 4 players (2)
| AUF Sports Arena & Cultural Center
| 4–4
|-bgcolor=ccffcc
| 9
| November 8
| Blackwater
| W 82–71
| Javee Mocon (19)
| Javee Mocon (13)
| 5 players (2)
| AUF Sports Arena & Cultural Center
| 5–4
|-bgcolor=ccffcc
| 10
| November 10
| TNT
| W 80–74
| Yap, Mocon (16)
| Javee Mocon (10)
| Beau Belga (4)
| AUF Sports Arena & Cultural Center
| 6–4
|-bgcolor=ffcccc
| 11
| November 11
| Phoenix
| L 88–90
| Ponferada, Mocon (13)
| Norwood, Mocon (7)
| Javee Mocon (4)
| AUF Sports Arena & Cultural Center
| 6–5

References

Rain or Shine Elasto Painters seasons
Rain or Shine Elasto Painters